The History of Rock is a compilation album by American rapper Kid Rock. Released in 2000, the album consists of re-recorded versions of songs from the album The Polyfuze Method, remixed versions of songs from the album Early Mornin' Stoned Pimp, demos and unreleased songs, including the single "American Bad Ass".

Music

Many of the compilation's songs were previously released on Kid Rock's second and third studio albums, The Polyfuze Method and Early Mornin' Stoned Pimp. The inclusions from The Polyfuze Method have been re-recorded for this compilation, while the songs from Early Mornin' Stoned Pimp are remixed.

The new recording "American Bad Ass" has been praised by Allmusic and Rolling Stone as being the best song on the compilation. The nu metal song is built around samples from Metallica's song "Sad but True", while paying lyrical tribute to Ritchie's influences such as Johnny Cash, Grandmaster Flash, David Allan Coe, the Beastie Boys and Bob Seger.

Also new to this compilation are the songs ”Abortion”, a hard rock blues song, "Fuck That", categorized by Entertainment Weekly as alternative rock, and ”Born 2 B a Hick”, which has been compared stylistically to Chuck Berry. "Fuck That" previously appeared on the soundtrack to the 1999 film Any Given Sunday.

”Born 2 B a Hick” was an older song that Kid Rock had never recorded. Despite its title, "Abortion" is an anti-drug ballad, which Rolling Stone described as "[finding] common ground between the Geto Boys and Lynyrd Skynyrd".

Reception

The History of Rock received mixed to positive reviews from critics, earning a 64 out of 100 score on Metacritic.

Kid Rock promoted the album with his History of Rock Tour.

Stephen Thomas Erlewine, writing for Allmusic, gave the album four out of five stars, saying that "It's not a great listen, but its swagger and white-trash style make it the second-best record in [Kid Rock's] catalog to date."

Rob Sheffield, writing for Rolling Stone, gave the album three out of five stars, writing that "History peaks with the two new songs". Entertainment Weekly panned the album, however, giving it a C, writing, "Perhaps this marginal collection by a potentially major act should have been called The History of Rap (by White Boys)."

Track listing

Credits

Kid Rock 
Robert James Ritchie - vocals, guitar, bass, keyboard, organ, drums

Twisted Brown Trucker
Joe C. - raps
Shirley Hayden - background vocals
Misty Love - background vocals
Jason Krause - guitar
Kenny Olson - guitar
Michael Bradford - bass
Jimmie Bones - keyboards
Uncle Kracker - turntables, background vocals
Stefanie Eulinberg - drums

Other personnel
 Wes Chill - spoken word on intro
 Michael Stevens - narration

Charts

Weekly charts

Year-end charts

Certifications

References

Kid Rock albums
2000 compilation albums
Atlantic Records compilation albums
Midwest hip hop albums
Rap metal albums